CM5 may refer to:

 Connection Machine CM5 supercomputer
 Part of the British CM postcode area
 Cocaine Muzik 5, a mixtape by rapper Yo Gotti.
 The CM5 Electrocardiography lead configuration (right arm electrode on manubrium, left arm electrode on V5 and indifferent lead on left shoulder), used to detect left ventricular ischaemia during general anaesthesia.